Sir Charles Kingsley Webster  (25 July 1886 – August 1961) was a British diplomat and historian. He was educated at Merchant Taylors' School, Crosby and King's College, Cambridge. After leaving Cambridge University, he went on to become a professor at Harvard, Oxford, and the London School of Economics (LSE). He also served as President of the British Academy from 1950 to 1954.

In addition to his career in academia, Webster worked extensively in the Foreign Office, especially in the United States, and was a leading supporter of the new United Nations, as he had been of the League of Nations.

Life
After studying at Cambridge, Webster became professor of international relations at the University of Wales, Aberystwyth where he wrote his two major books on the foreign policy of Lord Castlereagh, the first (published in 1925) covering the period 1815–1822, the second (published in 1931) that from 1812 to 1815. In 1932 Webster moved to the newly established Stevenson chair of international relations at the LSE.

During World War II, he worked extensively in the Foreign Office, especially in the United States, and was a leading supporter of the new United Nations, as he had been of the League of Nations. He was involved in the drafting of the UN Charter.

He attended the first meetings of both the General Assembly and the Security Council in January 1946 and the final meeting of the League of Nations in April. He was made a Knight Commander of the Order of St Michael and St George in the new year's honours list of 1946.

Career
In 1948, Webster gave the Ford Lectures at Oxford University. In 1951, his biography of Henry John Temple, 3rd Viscount Palmerston was finally published. He was President of the British Academy in 1950. He was awarded honorary degrees from Oxford, Cambridge, Wales, Rome, and Williams College, Massachusetts, and was made an honorary fellow of King's College, Cambridge. He retired from his chair at the LSE in 1953.

 Professor of Modern History, Liverpool University, 1914–1922
 Subaltern in the Royal Army Service Corps, 1915–1917
 General Staff of the War Office, 1917–1918
 Secretary, Military Section, British Delegation to the Conference of Paris, 1918–1919
 Wilson Professor of International Politics, University of Wales, 1922–1932
 Außerordentlicher (=Associate) Professor, University of Vienna, 1926
 Nobel Lecturer, Oslo, 1926
 Reader, University of Calcutta, India, 1927
 Professor of History, Harvard University, USA, 1928–1932
 Stevenson Professor of International History, London School of Economics and Political Science, 1932–1953
 Foreign Research and Press Service, 1939–1941
 Director, British School of Information, New York, 1941–1942
 Foreign Office, 1943–1946
 Member of British Delegation, Dumbarton Oaks and San Francisco Conferences, 1944–1945
 Member, Preparatory Commission and General Assembly, United Nations, 1945–1946
 Ford Lecturer, Oxford University, 1948
 President, 1950–1954, and Foreign Secretary, 1955–1958, British Academy

Works
 The Congress of Vienna, 1814–1815, London: Foreign Office Historical Section, 1919
 The Congress of Vienna, Oxford University Press, 1919 (with copyedit instructions, 1934), online at Internet Archive
 British diplomacy, 1813–1815 : select documents dealing with the reconstruction of Europe, 1921, 409p, online at Internet Archive
 The pacification of Europe, 1813–1815, 1922
 The Congress of Vienna, 1814–15, and the Conference of Paris, 1919, London, 1923
 The Foreign Policy of Castlereagh (1815–1822) Britain and the European Alliance, London: G. Bell and Sons, 1925, online at Internet Archive
 The European alliance, 1815–1825, University of Calcutta, 1929
 What the world owes to President Wilson, London: League of Nations Union, 1930
 The League of Nations in theory and practice, London: Allen and Unwin, 1933
 Palmerston, Metternich and the European system, 1830–1841, London: Humphrey Milford, London, 1934
 Editor of British diplomatic representatives, 1789–1852, London, 1934
 Editor of Britain and the independence of Latin America, 1812–1830, London: Ibero-American Institute of Great Britain, 1938
 Some problems of international organisation, University of Leeds, 1943
 Editor of Some letters of the Duke of Wellington to his brother, William Wellesley-Pole, London, 1948
 The Foreign Policy of Palmerston, 1830–1841: Britain, the Liberal Movement, and the Eastern Question, 1951, online edition of vol 2 
 The art and practice of diplomacy, London School of Economics, 1952, online 
 British Foreign Policy since the Second World War
 The founder of the national home, Weizmann Science Press of Israel, 1955
 Sanctions: the use of force in an international organisation, London, 1956
 The strategic air offensive against Germany, 1939–1945, London, Her Majesty's Stationery Office, 1961, coauthor, 3 volumes, official history

References

Sources
 Fagg, John Edwin. "Sir Charles Webster 1886– " in S. William Helperin, ed., Some 20th century historians (1961) pp 171–200.
 Hall, Ian. "The art and practice of a diplomatic historian: Sir Charles Webster, 1886–1961." International Politics 42.4 (2005): 470–490.
 Reynolds, P. A.  and E. J. Hughes, The historian as diplomat: Charles Kingsley Webster and the United Nations, 1939–1946, (1976).

External links
 
 Catalogue of the Webster papers at the Archives Division of the London School of Economics.

1886 births
1961 deaths
Academics of Aberystwyth University
Academics of the London School of Economics
Alumni of King's College, Cambridge
Royal Army Service Corps officers
British diplomats
British Army personnel of World War I
Knights Commander of the Order of St Michael and St George
Presidents of the British Academy
Academic staff of the University of Calcutta
20th-century British historians
People educated at Merchant Taylors' Boys' School, Crosby